Antoine Maria Joachim Lamoral de Ligne, 13th Prince of Ligne, Prince of Épinoy, Prince of Amblise, GE (8 March 1925 – 21 August 2005) was the son of Eugène, 11th Prince of Ligne, and his wife, Philippine de Noailles.

Life and career
Prince Antoine escaped from occupied Belgium in February 1943 and joined the RAF in June. After initial training in England, he won his wings at No. 34 Flying Training School in Medicine Hat, Canada, before returning to the UK for operational duty from December 1944 as a 2nd Lt. in the Belgian Air Force flying Spitfires with 349 Squadron.

Post-war, he attended the Central Flying School as a flying instructor with the reformed Belgian Air Force. Moved to 160 Wing until detached to Palestine on behalf of the Ministry of Foreign Affairs as UN Truce Observer during the formation of the State of Israel.

Promoted to Captain in December 1948, he served as Deputy Flight Commander of 2 Squadron during 1949-50. Served as Assistant Military Attache in Washington 1952-3, before returning to Belgium as Captain-Commandant to assume command of 9 Squadron flying Gloster Meteor 8s.

Prince Antoine resigned his commission on 1st September 1955 to join the first Belgian Antarctic Expedition under Commandant Gaston de Gerlache (with whom he had trained in the RAF in 1943), leaving Belgium in 1957. He flew many exploration flights over Antarctica in Austers and Bell 47 helicopters until returning to Belgium in March 1959; also took part in the subsequent Belgian expeditions in 1960 and 1965. 

He was the President of the Royal Belgian Aero Club for 20 years and President of the Belgian National Appeal for the World Wildlife Appeal for 10 years. He is a Chevalier of the Orders of Leopold and Leopold II and an Officer of the Order of the Crown. He was the 1,294th Knight of the Order of the Golden Fleece in Austria.

He died on 21 August 2005 at the castle of Belœil in Belœil, Belgium.

Family
He married Princess Alix of Luxembourg, daughter of Prince Felix of Bourbon-Parma and Charlotte, Grand Duchess of Luxembourg, on 17 August 1950 in Luxembourg.

They had seven children:
Michel, 14th Prince of Ligne (b. 26 May 1951), he married Princess Eleonora of Orléans-Braganza
Prince Wauthier de Ligne (10 July 1952 - 15 August 2022), he married Countess Regine van Renesse. His funeral took place at the church of Saint-Pierre de Belœil on 22 August 2022.
 Princess Anne-Marie de Ligne (b. 3 April 1954), she married Olivier Mortgat
Princess Christine de Ligne (b. 11 August 1955), she married Prince Antonio of Orléans-Braganza.
Princess Sophie de Ligne (b. 23 April 1957), she married Count Philippe de Nicolay, son of Baroness Marie-Hélène de Rothschild.
Prince Antoine de Ligne (b. 28 December 1959). he married Countess Minthia de Lannoy
Princess Yolande de Ligne (b. 16 June 1964), she married Hugo Townsend, son of Group Captain Peter Townsend

Ancestry

References

External links 

1925 births
2005 deaths
Nobility from Brussels
13
20th-century Spanish nobility
Spanish princes
Grandees of Spain
Royal Air Force personnel of World War II
Knights of the Golden Fleece of Austria